Bungo Stray Dogs is a manga that centers the weretiger Atsushi Nakajima as he joins other gifted people with supernatural powers and use them for different purposes including holding a business, solving mysteries, and carrying out missions assigned by the mafia. The story mainly follows the members of the "Armed Detective Agency" and their everyday lives. Kafka Asagiri and Sango Harukawa began publishing the manga in Kadokawa Shoten's seinen magazine Young Ace in 2012. Kadokawa has compiled the series into twenty-three tankōbon volumes as of December 2022. The series has been licensed for North America by Yen Press with the first volume being released on December 20, 2016. An anime television series adaptation produced by Bones was directed by Takuya Igarashi and written by Yōji Enokido. An original video animation was bundled with the 13th limited edition manga volume, which was released on 31 August 2017.

In 2018, Bones produced a film titled Bungo Stray Dogs: Dead Apple. A manga adaptation of two volumes by a different artist was developed in the same year. A series of light novels have been written by the same writer and artist from the original manga. While some focus on Osamu Dazai's past and different spin-offs, a gaiden story was produced where Atsushi Nakajima is alternately portrayed as a member from Port Mafia. Another spin-off, Bungo Stray Dogs: Another Story - Yukito Ayatsuji vs. Natsuhiko Kyogoku, was also written.

Volume list

Bungo Stray Dogs

Bungo Stray Dogs: Wan!

Bungo Stray Dogs: Dead Apple

Bungo Stray Dogs: Another Story - Yukito Ayatsuji vs. Natsuhiko Kyogoku

Bungo Stray Dogs: BEAST

Bungo Stray Dogs: Dazai, Chūya, Jūgosai

Light novels
Four novels in the series, including a spin-off novel featuring Yukito Ayatsuji and Natsuhiko Kyougoku; written by Asagiri and with illustrations by Harukawa, have been published by Kadokawa.  On 8 July 2018, during their panel at Anime Expo, Yen Press announced that they had licensed the light novels.

References

Bungo Stray Dogs